The administrative divisions of Hunan, a province of the People's Republic of China, consists of prefecture-level divisions subdivided into county-level divisions then subdivided into township-level divisions.

Administrative divisions
All of these administrative divisions are explained in greater detail at Administrative divisions of the People's Republic of China. This chart lists only prefecture-level and county-level divisions of Hunan.

Recent changes in administrative divisions

Population composition

Prefectures

Counties

See also
List of County-level divisions of Hunan by population

References

 01
.
Hunan
Hunan